Insentiraja laxipella, commonly known as the eastern looseskin skate, is a small deep-water skate in the family Arhynchobatidae. Its known range includes only the continental slope off Queensland.

Due to the limited knowledge of its biology and extent of capture in fisheries, this species is assessed as Data Deficient.

References

Rajiformes
Fish of the Pacific Ocean
Fish described in 1992